Charline von Heyl (born 1960) is a German abstract painter. She also works with drawing, printmaking, and collage. She moved to the United States in the 1990s, and has studios in New York City and in Marfa, Texas.

Life 

Von Heyl was born in Mainz and spent her childhood in Bonn. Her father was a lawyer, her mother a psychologist. She studied painting at the Hochschule für bildende Künste of Hamburg under Jörg Immendorff, and at the Kunstakademie Düsseldorf under Fritz Schwegler. In the mid-1990s she moved to New York City, where she has a studio in the Brooklyn Navy Yard.

Work 
In 2005, von Heyl's exhibition Concentrations 48: Charline von Heyl was held at the Dallas Museum of Art in Dallas, Texas, USA, and in 2009, her work was exhibited in Le jour de boire est arrivé held at Le Consortium, a contemporary art center in Dijon, France.

In 2011-2012, von Heyl had two major traveling retrospectives. Charline von Heyl, Now or Else started at the Tate Liverpool in Liverpool, England and subsequently traveled to the Kunsthalle Nürnberg in Nuremberg, Germany and the Bonner Kunstverein in Bonn, Germany. A second show, Charline von Heyl, was exhibited within the United States at the Institute of Contemporary Art, Boston and the Institute of Contemporary Art, Philadelphia.

In 2018, the Hirshhorn Museum and Sculpture Garden exhibited the largest U.S. museum survey ever of von Heyl's work. Featuring more than thirty large-scale paintings, Charline von Heyl: Snake Eyes was extended due to its popularity at the museum.

Reception
Von Heyl was one of six finalists for the 2014 Hugo Boss Prize.

References

Further reading 
 Oranges and Sardines. Hammer Museum, Los Angeles, 2009.
 Bomb, Number 113. Bomb (Interview), 2010.
 Charline von Heyl Paintings 1990-2010. Les presses du réel, 2010.
 Parkett, No. 89. Parkett, 2011.
 Charline von Heyl. Institute of Contemporary Art, Philadelphia, 2011.
 Charline von Heyl Now or Else. Tate Liverpool and Kunsthalle Nürnberg, 2012.

German abstract artists
German contemporary artists
Living people
1960 births
German women painters
People from Marfa, Texas
Artists from Bonn
Artists from New York City
21st-century German women artists